Dattatreya Hosabale (born 1 December 1954) is an Indian social worker who is the current General Secretary of the Rashtriya Swayamsevak Sangh (RSS) since March 2021. During the period of Indian Emergency from 1975 to 1977 he was arrested under the Maintenance of Internal Security Act (MISA) and imprisoned for 16 months. He also served as the general secretary for the student organization, Akhil Bharatiya Vidyarthi Parishad for 15 years.

Early life 
Dattatreya Hosabale was born in 1954 in Soraba in Shimoga, Karnataka. Hailing from a family of RSS activists, he is the founding trustee of India Policy Foundation, a non-profit policy research organization.

Association with RSS 
He is a post graduate in English literature from Mysuru University. He joined RSS in 1968 and then its affiliated student wing ABVP in 1972. He became a full-time organizer in 1978. His stint in the ABVP encouraged the RSS higher ups to appoint him general secretary of the ABVP in 1978 and he held the post for over 15 years. He played an active role in setting up the Youth Development Centre in Guwahati, Assam.

He was the founding editor of Aseema, a Kannada & English monthly. He became Sah-Baudhik Pramukh (second in command of the intellectual wing of RSS) in 2004. He is fluent in Kannada, Hindi, Marathi, English and Sanskrit.He has voiced his opinion on Indian Secularism being anti-Hindu, saying "When it comes to the Idea of India, there is no dispute as such; the point is that there can be a variety of ideas and each must be permitted its space. It’s not necessary that they should be at loggerheads or contradictory to each other" He was back in RSS in 2003 and was appointed the RSS’s Sah-Bauddhik Pramukh (joint-incharge of intellectual activities) in 2004. Then, in 2009, he became sah-sarkaryawah in the team of Suresh Joshi, when the latter replaced Mohan Bhagwat at the post.

He is the first Sar-karyawah most of whose time as pracharak was spent in an anushangik (frontal organization), that is ABVP.

Views 
He termed football as symbol of global oneness. Football has been a great unifier having admirers, fans,  adherents and  adepts across civilisations, continents & borders. It has been so since ages – in ancient India, as in ancient Greece the game of tackling the ball and hitting it around with the foot was a hugely popular sport enjoyed by the vast majority – ruler as well as the commoner.

References

External links 

 

Rashtriya Swayamsevak Sangh pracharaks
1955 births
Living people
People from Shimoga
Hindutva